Trevor Jones (3 May 1918 – 22 July 1985) was an  Australian rules footballer who played with North Melbourne in the Victorian Football League (VFL).

Notes

External links 
		

1918 births
1985 deaths
Australian rules footballers from Victoria (Australia)
North Melbourne Football Club players